The Faculty of Agriculture of Kagawa University specialises in pure and applied research in bioscience and biotechnology.

History
The Kagawa School was established in 1903, one of the first agricultural training institutions in Japan. It was committed to developing and utilizing a scientific approach and the newest techniques to advance agriculture in Japan. Over the years, the school grew and adapted to meet the changing demands of agriculture, culminating with its integration with Kagawa University in 1955 as the Faculty of Agriculture. Since then, changes in agriculture have accelerated and many new and exciting technologies and fields of study have emerged. While the Faculty of Agriculture has continued to grow and develop to meet these challenges, the commitment to advancing agriculture, laid down in 1903, remains strong.

Organization
Faculty members: 66

Undergraduate Students: 600 (150 new students per academic year)

Department of Applied Biological Science
Undergraduate education is conducted by the Department of Applied Biological Science in cooperation with the University Farm and the Marine Environment Research Station. There are four academic courses:

Applied Life Science
Applied life sciences focuses on biological phenomena and functions of various forms of life (microorganisms to plants and higher animals) and essential knowledge and advanced technology of the life sciences.

Bioresource Production Science
Bioresource Production Sciences focuses on the principle and technology of bioresources production, post-harvest and environmental control including economics.

Bioresource Chemistry and Bioenvironmental Science
Bioresource Chemistry and Bioenvironmental Science focuses on essential knowledge and application of various chemical substances with biological functions, and on developing a solid foundation in the chemistry and biology of various ecosystems (from the terrestrial land to the seas).

Food Science
Food Science focuses on technology for developing food with consumer preference and functionality, essential chemical knowledge to understand functions of food, and food functionality, food safety, food processing property and food preference.

Graduate School of Agriculture
The Graduate School of Agriculture offers an academic program for a Master’s degree. The Graduate School consists of the following three academic divisions and a special Master’s course:

Division of Bioresource Production Science
Bioresource Production Science has four research groups with specialized research targets:
(1) Agricultural Science: stable supply of food for the future
(2) Horticultural Science: efficient production, propagation and utilization of horticultural crops
(3) Environmental Science: understanding of ecosystems and preservation of the environment

Division of Applied Bioresource Science
Applied Bioresource Science has four research groups with specialized research targets: 
(1) Applied Bioorganic Chemistry: utilization of biologically active compounds in bioresources
(2) Microbial & Animal Biotechnology: fundamental and applied fields of life sciences
(3) Plant Biotechnology: research and application of genetic engineering for selective breeding of target plants 
(4) Food Science: research on nutritional, physicochemical and biological effects of various food types

Division of Rare Sugar Science
Rare Sugar Science specializes in the production of rare sugars production (monosaccharides & derivatives), as well as the utilization and application of rare sugars to life science and food science. This division cooperates and partners with industry, government, and academia through joint projects and consortiums.

Special Master’s Course for International Scholars
1. The Special Course for International Students from Asian, African, and Pacific Rim Countries(AAP Program)
This Course has been developed to provide an opportunity to international students to further their studies and prepare them for admission to the doctoral program. The course is conducted entirely in English and scholars (are eligible to) receive financial support from the Japanese government. Privately financed scholars may also apply for the admission to the Special Master’s Course.

2. The Special Course Career Development Program for Foreigner Student in Japan (Asiajinzaishikinkousou)
This program provides educational programs including professional education programs supported by universities and industry as well as business Japanese language education, mainly for foreign students who newly visit Japan with a will to work for Japanese companies, at an industry-academia consortium consisting of academia and companies

The United Graduate School of Agricultural Sciences (Doctoral Course)
The United Graduate School of Agricultural Science (UGAS) is a consortium built on the integrated Master’s courses of Kagawa, Kochi, and Ehime Universities. UGAS is a three-year doctoral program with studies available in:
• Bioresource Production Science 
• Applied Bioresource Science 
• Life Environment Conservation Science

Gene Research Center & the Center for Instrumental Analysis
The Kagawa University Gene Research Center was founded in 1999 to support frontier research and education on gene manipulation. Both centers feature state-of-the-art technology, such as a TOF-Mass spectrometer, a multi-capillary DNA sequencer, an electron probe X-ray micro-analyzer, electron microscopes, DNA sequencers, amino acid analyzers, and a 600 MHz FT-NMR spectrometer.

Rare Sugar Research Center
Rare sugars, defined as monosaccharides and their derivatives, are present in nature in a very limited amount. The Rare Sugar Research Center was founded in 2002 to promote extensive and intensive research on rare sugars. Research staff of the Faculty of Agriculture participate in research projects ranging from rare sugars production to the applications rare sugars.

University Farm
The university farm, founded in 1958 four distinct divisions: crop science, livestock production, pomology, and olericulture-floriculture. Researchers explore new applications of advanced techniques. “Kadainou R-1”, a new grape cultivar, is one recent breakthrough of the university farm research. It was developed by crossing wild grapes, indigenous to Okinawa, and Muscat of Alexandria, known for its high quality. The wine produced from Kadainou R-1, "Souvageonne Savoureuse" is a clear, fresh, and well-balanced red wine (or other “correct wine terms). Based on this success, the university farm began a cooperative venture with regional organizations for the stable cultivation of the grapes and production of "Souvageonne Savoureuse".

Marine Environment Research Station
The research station was established in 1973 to investigate the environment of the Seto Inland Sea and to conduct research on shallow water ecosystems. The station has two modern research vessels with on-board research facilities and equipment to ensure that scholars are fully able to pursue their research interests.

An international environment
The campus has scholars from more than 10 different countries. The Faculty of Agriculture also offers Japanese culture and language courses to help international students adjust to life in Japan. The campus is located in the suburbs of Takamatsu.

International exchange with academic institutions worldwide is considered one of the primary means of attaining and strengthening academic excellence. The Faculty of Agriculture has a long history of academic cooperation and has academic-exchange agreements with:

• Australia
➢	University of Western Australia
• Cambodia
➢	University of Battambang
➢	Royal University of Agriculture
• Germany
➢	Fachhochschule Wiesbaden
• Thailand 
➢	Chiang Mai University
➢	Chulalongkorn University
➢	Kasetsart University 
➢	Maejo University
• Finland
➢	Helsinki University of Technology
• France
➢	Agrosup Dijon, University of Burgundy
• Bangladesh
➢	University of Dhaka
➢	Sher-e-Bangla Agricultural University
• People’s Republic of China 
➢	Henan Agricultural University
➢	Nanjing Agricultural University
➢	Tianjin Agricultural College
➢	Zhejiang Gongshang University
• Indonesia 
➢	Bogor Agricultural University
• Spain 
➢	University of Cadiz
• United States of America
➢	University of California, Davis
➢	Michigan State University

References

External links
  
  
  {special course-Career Development Program}

Kagawa University